Aviance Records is an independent record label company founded in March 2014 by New York City's nightlife personality and vogue  dancer Mother Juan Aviance with business partner DJ/Producer David Ohana Aviance.

Aviance Records is a multi-genre record label company that promotes new and upcoming artists. It is a division of the House of Aviance brand—one of the legendary ballroom houses in the U.S. The company is headed by Mother Juan Aviance (CEO / A&R) and David Ohana Aviance (CEO / Producer).

The first record released on this label was a house track titled Avi’ously Aviance (2014), produced by David Ohana Aviance and featuring EJ Aviance, Kevin Aviance, Perry Aviance and Mother Juan Aviance. Since then, it has gone on to release other tracks such as Discotech (produced by dEEcEE); Who You Are (produced by Ohana and Morabito); Circles (by Rob Moore), the soulful track They Don't See — a collaboration between producer/remixer Call Me Cleve (Cleveland Allen) and vocalist Zhana Roiya; Take Control by Shanee; OVAH by Erickatoure Aviance — produced Adam Joseph; and Vogue Is My Religion by Coby Koehl -  mixes by Adam Joseph and David Ohana Aviance.

Discography

See also
 List of record labels

References

External links
Aviance Records, LLC official website
Aviance Records, LLC official YouTube Channel
The House of Aviance and Aviance Record's official blog

American independent record labels
Record labels established in 2014
House of Aviance
Companies based in New York City